La Guiablesse is a 1927 ballet composition in nine-movements by American composer William Grant Still. The ballet was first performed in 1933 
by Howard Hanson and Thelma Biracree at the Eastman School of Music in Rochester, New York, and Ruth Page in Chicago, Illinois. The work is about nineteen minutes long.

Overview
A description of the ballet is presented as follows:

Movements
The ballet is in nine movements as follows:

Reviews
Reviewer Herman Devries of the Chicago American noted, "[The ballet] is far above the average ballet music . . . both in quality of invention and in the value of its themes and imagination. It is a highly-colored, vivid, evocative, gorgeous score." Another reviewer, Stuart R. Sabin of Rochester, wrote, "The music is charming, picturesque and dramatically suggestive, never padded, never divorced from the action, yet with an individual appeal of its own."

See also
 List of ballets by title
 List of jazz-influenced classical compositions

References

Further reading

External links
 La Guiablesse (complete; 18:36)

Compositions by William Grant Still
1927 compositions